is an autobahn that crosses Germany in a west–east direction. Works to continue the A 4 are in progress, but currently no plans exist to fill the gap completely.

The A 4 starts north-west of Aachen, where the Dutch A76 enters Germany. Initially it is 2 lanes each way with no speed limit. From Kreuz Aachen to Düren and from Kerpen to Refrath (between Refrath and Köln-Merheim westbound the hard shoulder is the 3rd lane and only open at peak times) it has 3 lanes each way. Between Kreuz Köln-West and Kreuz Heumar it forms the southern part of the Cologne Beltway (Kölner Autobahnring). The whole rest of the section between Kreuz Aachen and Kreuz Köln-West has a variable speed limit. Between Merzenich and Elsdorf, there is a speed limit of 130 km/h, that has been imposed in 2017, due to an increase of accidents. Between  Kreuz Köln-West and Kreuz Heumar the speed limit is 120 km/h. From Kreuz Köln-Ost to Refrath there is a maximum limit of 100 km/h. The westbound section between Köln-Merheim and Kreuz Köln-Ost is restricted to 80 km/h. The section between Refrath and the current terminus at Krombach has no speed limit. Only between Untereschbach and Refrath westbound there is a 100 km/h speed limit from 6 - 10 am on weekdays. It is mostly 2 lanes each way, but between Untereschbach and Wiehl there are several additional climbing lanes in both directions.

The eastern part starts at the Kirchheim intersection (with the A 7) and goes through Eisenach, Gotha, Erfurt, Weimar, Jena, Gera, Chemnitz and Dresden to Görlitz, where it crosses the border to Poland and continues as A4 (Poland).

The westernmost 11 kilometers of the A 4 form the most easterly stretch of the European route E314: continuing east from the Aachen interchange (Kreuz Aachen), the A 4 is part of the European route E40. European routes don't have gaps and E40 follows A 45 and A 5, which is a suitable route past the gap of A 4.

The first sections of the A 4 were built in the years 1934 to 1937. Just west of Eisenach was the Wartha-Herleshausen border checkpoint between East and West Germany. However, just eight kilometers down the road, after the Wommen interchange, the road crosses back into the former territory of East Germany into Gerstungen (today in Thuringia) for seven kilometers, before crossing back to the former West Germany at Wildeck. Because of that, the section between Wommen and Wildeck-Obersuhl interchanges was closed and fell into decay during the time of German division, it was bypassed by B400 road. Repairs of those parts are scheduled to be completed in 2007. Reconstruction of last section in Thuringia between Eisenach and Gotha near the former Inner German Border began in 2007 and required building  of new road. Vinci SA and Hochtief were the contracted to build the new road.

Wiehltalbrücke accident 
The "Wiehltalbrücke" is a bridge which carries the A 4 across the valley of the river Wiehl. The A 4 near Gummersbach, North Rhine-Westphalia was the site of the most expensive traffic accident in German history: On 26 August 2004, a BMW M3, whose driver did not hold a driving licence and was later found to be driving under the influence, collided with a tanker lorry, carrying 33,000 litres of gasoline. The lorry broke through a guardrail, fell off the Wiehltalbrücke and exploded, killing the driver. The subsequent fire caused severe structural damage to the bridge.  The driver of the BMW was jailed for 22 months without parole in September 2005.

The bridge was closed for weeks until temporary repairs were completed. Permanent repairs began on 28 July 2006 and finished on 22 August 2006, using a unique method never before used in Germany. For the duration of the repairs, where among other things a 20 m × 31 m segment was replaced, the bridge was closed. The repairs cost 7.2 million euros.

References

External links 
 

4
A004
A004
A004
A004